Milton  "Milt" Windler (born January 10, 1932 in Hampton, Virginia) is a retired NASA Flight Director. He is best known for his work as one of the four flight directors of Apollo 13 Mission Operations Team, all of whom were awarded the Presidential Medal of Freedom by President Richard M. Nixon for their work in guiding the crippled spacecraft safely back to Earth. Previously a jet fighter pilot, he began working at NASA in 1959 during Project Mercury. Originally working in the recovery division, he was promoted to flight director by Chris Kraft to support Eugene Kranz, who had acquired additional responsibilities in the months following the Apollo 1 fire. Windler also served as flight director for Apollo 8, Apollo 10, Apollo 11, Apollo 14, Apollo 15, and all three Skylab missions. Following the conclusion of the Apollo Program, Windler worked in the Space Shuttle Project Office on Remote Manipulator Systems Operations until 1978. He is a recipient of the NASA Exceptional Service Medal.

References

Sources
Failure Is Not an Option: Mission Control from Mercury to Apollo 13 and Beyond Gene Kranz, Simon and Schuster, 2000,

External links
New Mexico State University Apollo 14 Commemoration
NASA Roster of Flight Directors for the Apollo Program

Living people
NASA people
Presidential Medal of Freedom recipients
1932 births